The 2021 FIFA Futsal World Cup was the ninth edition of the FIFA Futsal World Cup, the quadrennial international futsal championship contested by the men's national teams of the member associations of FIFA. The tournament was held in Lithuania. It marked the first FIFA tournament ever hosted by Lithuania and the third Futsal World Cup hosted in Europe; the others being 1989 in the Netherlands and 1996 in Spain.

The tournament was originally scheduled to be held from 12 September to 4 October 2020 as the 2020 FIFA Futsal World Cup. However, due to the COVID-19 pandemic, FIFA announced on 3 April 2020 that a decision would be made whether the tournament would be postponed and rescheduled. On 12 May 2020, FIFA announced that the tournament would be held between 12 September and 3 October 2021, subject to further monitoring.

In the final, Portugal defeated the defending champions Argentina 2–1 to win their first World Cup title. They became the fourth team to win the competition, the second from Europe after Spain's triumphs in 2000 and 2004.

Host selection
The following countries bid for the tournament:

The eight bidders represent the highest ever for the FIFA Futsal World Cup. Since none of these countries have ever hosted the event before, the tournament will be heading to a new location, later shortlisted to four. The Czech Republic, Egypt, Georgia, the Netherlands and the United States expressed interest but eventually did not bid.

The host were originally to be appointed by December 2016, then delayed to December 2017. Costa Rica, Croatia, Kazakhstan and the United Arab Emirates were later eliminated from contention.

The hosts were selected by the FIFA Council on 26 October 2018 in Kigali, Rwanda from the final four candidates: Iran, Japan, Lithuania and New Zealand. Lithuania was chosen over Iran, Japan and New Zealand as host for the 2020 edition.

Qualification
A total of 24 teams from six separate continental competitions qualified for the final tournament, in addition to hosts Lithuania. The slot allocation was approved by the FIFA Council on 10 June 2018.

Venues
Lithuania presented three cities – Vilnius (Avia Solutions Group Arena), Kaunas (Žalgiris Arena) and Klaipėda (Švyturys Arena) in their bid to host the event. During press conference on 22 November 2018 it was revealed that the Lithuanian Football Federation would like to expand number of host cities with up to 3 additional locations. Šiauliai (Šiauliai Arena), Panevėžys (Cido Arena) and Alytus (Alytus Arena) were named as additional candidates and are currently awaiting for a FIFA delegates inspection to determine their suitability. Further negotiations should resume in February 2019. An inspection was done on 10 May 2019 on all five potential host cities: Vilnius (Siemens Arena), Kaunas (Žalgiris Arena), Klaipėda (Švyturys Arena), Šiauliai (Šiauliai Arena) and Panevėžys (Cido Arena).

The final decision was made on 16 October 2019, it will be staged in three cities: Vilnius (Avia Solutions Group Arena), Kaunas (Žalgiris Arena) and Klaipėda (Švyturys Arena). Šiauliai (Šiauliai Arena) and Panevėžys (Cido Arena) were left out due to accommodation hotel concerns.

Marketing
The Emblem was launched on 17 January 2020 at the MO Museum in Vilnius.

The emblem highlights two of Lithuania's proudest features: its natural resources and technological expertise. The base of the emblem represents the country's lush, green landscape, decorated with oak leaves. A symbol of strength, the native oak has been venerated in Lithuania for centuries. Following the lines of the FIFA Futsal World Cup Trophy, oaks give way to farmland and meadows in the colours of the Lithuanian flag. The prominence given to the landscape highlights Lithuania's commitment to the preservation of its natural heritage.

The top half of the emblem is inspired by Lithuania's modern technological industries. Lasers shoot skywards towards a stylised futsal pitch as a reminder of the country's accomplishments in the science and high-tech industries.

On 21 September 2020, Ivartito, a stork (which is the national bird of Lithuania since 1973), was unveiled as the official mascot.

Draw
The official draw was held on 1 June 2021, 17:00 CEST (UTC+2), at the FIFA headquarters in Zürich, Switzerland. The 24 teams were drawn into six groups of four teams. The hosts Lithuania were automatically seeded into Pot 1 and assigned to position A1, while the remaining teams were seeded into their respective pots based on their results in the last five FIFA Futsal World Cups (more recent tournaments weighted more heavily), with bonus points awarded to confederation champions. No group could contain more than one team from each confederation, except there would be one group with two UEFA teams due to there being seven UEFA teams in total.

Match officials
The following officials were chosen for the tournament.

Squads

Each team has to name a preliminary squad of a maximum of 25 players (3 of whom must be goalkeepers). From the preliminary squad, the team has to name a final squad of 14 players (two of whom must be goalkeepers) by the FIFA deadline. Players in the final squad can be replaced by a player from the preliminary squad due to serious injury or illness up to 24 hours prior to kickoff of the team's first match.

Group stage
The schedule of the competition was released on 30 April 2021.

The top two teams of each group and the four best third-placed teams advance to the round of 16.

Tiebreakers
The rankings of teams in each group are determined as follows:

If two or more teams are equal on the basis of the above three criteria, their rankings are determined as follows:

All times are local, EEST (UTC+3).

Group A

Group B

Group C

Group D

Group E

Group F

Ranking of third-placed teams

Knockout stage
In the knockout stage, if a match is level at the end of normal playing time, extra time shall be played (two periods of five minutes each) and followed, if necessary, by kicks from the penalty mark to determine the winner. However, for the third place match, if it is played directly before the final, no extra time shall be played and the winner shall be determined by kicks from the penalty mark.

Bracket

Combinations of matches in the Round of 16
The specific match-ups involving the third-placed teams depend on which four third-placed teams qualified for the round of 16:

Round of 16

Quarter-finals

Semi-finals

Third place match

Final

Champions

Goalscorers

Tournament ranking 
Per statistical convention in football, matches decided in extra time are counted as wins and losses, while matches decided by penalty shoot-out are counted as draws.

References

External links

 
2020
FIFA World Cup
FIFA World Cup
September 2021 sports events in Europe
October 2021 sports events in Europe
International futsal competitions hosted by Lithuania
Sports events postponed due to the COVID-19 pandemic